Vicente de Paula Mercedes (born 2 March 1996), known as Vicente, is a Brazilian football player who plays for VPK-Ahro Shevchenkivka.

Club career
He made his Ukrainian Premier League debut for FC Lviv on 9 March 2019 in a game against FC Zorya Luhansk.

References

External links
 

1996 births
Footballers from São Paulo
Living people
Brazilian footballers
Brazilian expatriate footballers
Association football defenders
Grêmio Osasco Audax Esporte Clube players
FC Lviv players
KF Bylis Ballsh players
FC Hirnyk-Sport Horishni Plavni players
FC VPK-Ahro Shevchenkivka players
Campeonato Brasileiro Série D players
Ukrainian Premier League players
Ukrainian First League players
Kategoria Superiore players
Expatriate footballers in Ukraine
Expatriate footballers in Albania
Brazilian expatriate sportspeople in Ukraine
Brazilian expatriate sportspeople in Albania